The 2014 Washington State Cougars football team represented Washington State University during the 2014 NCAA Division I FBS football season. The team was coached by third-year head coach Mike Leach and played their home games at Martin Stadium in Pullman, Washington. They were members of the North Division of the Pac-12 Conference.  They finished the season with a 3–9 overall record and a 2–7 mark in conference play to finish in a tie for fifth place in the North Division.

Schedule

Source:

Game summaries

Rutgers

@ Nevada

Portland State

Oregon

@ Utah

California

@ Stanford

Arizona

USC

@ Oregon State

@ Arizona State

Washington

Statistics

Team

References

Washington State
Washington State Cougars football seasons
Washington State Cougars football